The violet-capped hummingbird (Goldmania violiceps) is a Near Threatened species of hummingbird in the "emeralds", tribe Trochilini of subfamily Trochilinae. It is found in Panama and far northwestern Colombia.

Taxonomy and systematics

The violet-capped hummingbird is monotypic. It shares it genus with the Pirre hummingbird.

Description

Males weigh  and females . Both sexes have a straight bill that is mostly black with a pink base to the mandible. The male's crown is iridescent violet-blue and most of the rest of the body is metallic green. Its tail is slightly forked and maroon with wide white edges to the feathers. The female has green upperparts and whitish underparts with gray spots on the throat and green ones along the side. Its tail feathers are maroon with white tips.

Distribution and habitat

The violet-capped hummingbird is found in several unconnected mountainous areas in central and eastern Panama and extreme northwestern Colombia.

Behavior

Movement

The violet-capped hummingbird is a year-round resident throughout its range.

Feeding

The violet-capped hummingbird forages for nectar in dense undergrowth, feeding mainly on low flowering shrubs like Salvia, Pachystachis, Palicourea and Psammisia.

Breeding

The violet-capped hummingbird's breeding season appears to span at least from December to April, but nothing else is known about its breeding phenology. Its nest has not been described.

Vocalization

The violet-capped hummingbird's song is "a low, rapid chirping." Its call is "a series of irregularly repeated, very nasal and fairly low-pitched notes, 'kyek...kyek-kyek-kyek...kyek...'" that is typically given while hovering or feeding.

Status

The IUCN originally assessed the violet-capped hummingbird as being of Least Concern but since 2017 has rated it Near Threatened. It has a small range; its population size is not known and is believed to be decreasing. "A slow amount of deforestation may be threatening this species, but much of this habitat has not been affected by man yet." It is considered fairly common to locally common.

References

Further reading
 Angehr, George R., and Robert Dean.  The Birds of Panama A Field Guide. Ithaca and London: Comstock Publishing Associates, 2010. Print.

violet-capped hummingbird
Hummingbird species of Central America
Birds of Panama
violet-capped hummingbird
Taxonomy articles created by Polbot